Frank McKeown (born 18 August 1986) is a Scottish professional footballer and coach who played as a central defender. He has played for Stranraer, Raith, Partick Thistle, Greenock Morton, Alloa Athletic and junior club Arthurlie. McKeown is currently assistant manager at Scottish League One side Dumbarton.

Playing career
After being released by Partick Thistle as an 18-year-old, McKeown signed with junior club Linlithgow Rose before moving on to Arthurlie. In 2011, McKeown went senior with Stranraer where he stayed for four years and became club captain in 2013.

In 2015, the opportunity arose to turn full-time with Greenock Morton. He made his debut from the bench in a cup-tie against Elgin City as a late substitute. After less than ten minutes of professional football, McKeown suffered extensive knee ligament damage and was ruled out for at least six months.

McKeown was released by Morton at the end of April 2016, after not recovering from his injury, subsequently returning to Stranraer in June 2016. McKeown made a further 18 appearances for the Blues before departing the club on 11 January 2017, signing for fellow Scottish League One side Alloa Athletic on 13 January 2017. He left the club in May 2018, following their promotion to the Scottish Championship.

Coaching career 
McKeown moved into coaching as first team coach at Stranraer in 2019. He was promoted to assistant manager in May 2020 when Chris Aitken left the position to join brother Stephen Aitken at East Kilbride. McKeown left the Blues in May 2021, following manager Stephen Farrell to Dumbarton.

Personal life
As well as being a part-time footballer until he joined Morton, McKeown worked full-time as a fireman. He was involved in the rescue attempts after the Clutha Vaults tragedy in 2013.

References

External links

Living people
Footballers from Glasgow
Greenock Morton F.C. players
1986 births
Association football defenders
Scottish footballers
Raith Rovers F.C. players
Arthurlie F.C. players
Stranraer F.C. players
Alloa Athletic F.C. players
Linlithgow Rose F.C. players
Scottish Football League players
Scottish Professional Football League players
Scottish Junior Football Association players
British firefighters